Bagadya (Bağaca) is a rural locality (a selo), the administrative centre of and one of two settlements, in addition to Keng-Kyuyol, in Surguluksky Rural Okrug of Verkhnevilyuysky District in the Sakha Republic, Russia. Its population as of the 2010 Census was 460, of whom 237 were male and 223 female, down from 522 as recorded during the 2002 Census.

References

Notes

Sources
Official website of the Sakha Republic. Registry of the Administrative-Territorial Divisions of the Sakha Republic. Verkhnevilyuysky District. 

Rural localities in Verkhnevilyuysky District